Reiss is a British fashion brand and retail store chain owned and run by the founder, David Reiss. The brand produces men's and women's clothing. It has 160 stores in 15 countries.

Reiss was founded in 1971, and its first store in London's Bishopsgate sold men's suits. It did not move into women's clothes until 2000.

The Reiss flagship store and headquarters in London, designed by Squire and Partners, has won several awards including the RIBA Award, the BCO Award and the Civic Trust Award. The brand was named Fashion Retailer of the Year in 2003 at the British Style Awards.

Reiss has seen a significant increase in the number of its stores to 160 outlets worldwide, including key stores in Heathrow Terminal 5 and Westfield London as well as over four dozen locations across the United States as of 2022. Reiss intends to eventually grow to 250 stores worldwide. 

In April 2016, a majority stake was sold to the American private equity firm Warburg Pincus for £230 million.

References

External links

Clothing brands of the United Kingdom
Clothing companies established in 1971
Retail companies established in 1971